Bears Can't Run Downhill is a book by Robert Anwood published in 2006 by Ebury Press. It popularises the idea of pub facts. It is written to investigate (and thereby debunk or confirm) commonly held beliefs such as "One dog year equals seven human years" and "In the UK, it is illegal to burn money."

It was followed by a sequel, Emus Can't Walk Backwards, published in September 2007.

External links
Page about Bears Can't Run Downhill on author's official site

2006 non-fiction books
Trivia books
Ebury Publishing books